Jaak Mee (born 1970) is an Estonian military personnel.

Until 2020 he was the commander of Headquarters of the Estonian Defence League. Since 2020 he is the Estonian Military Attache in Russia and Belarus.

In 1997 he was awarded with Order of the Cross of the Eagle's silver cross.

References

Living people
1970 births
Estonian military personnel